St. Paul's School, New Delhi is an unaided, co-educational English-medium private school run by The Delhi Orthodox Syrian Church Society, located in Safdarjung Development Area, South Delhi.

History
The school was established on 28 April 1968 under the Delhi Orthodox Church Trust Society. Currently the school has more than 2200 students and 120 faculty members. The school had a complete pass rate among all the students who gave the Grade 12 board exams.

See also
Education in India
Education in Delhi
List of schools in Delhi
CBSE

References

External links

Schools in Delhi
Private schools in Delhi
Educational institutions established in 1968
Malankara Orthodox Syrian Church